Jean-Emmanuel Cassin is a French rugby footballer who plays rugby union for Oyonnax Rugby and represented his country at rugby league in the 2000 World Cup.

Playing career
Cassin played rugby league for Toulouse Olympique and was first selected to represent France in 1999. He played at the 2000 World Cup and on the 2001 tour of New Zealand and Papua New Guinea.

Later in the 2001 season Cassin switched to rugby union. He has since played for Biarritz Olympique, US Montauban
US Colomiers, Section Paloise and Oyonnax Rugby.

References

Living people
French rugby league players
France national rugby league team players
Rugby league centres
1980 births
Toulouse Olympique players
French rugby union players
Place of birth missing (living people)
Biarritz Olympique players
Rugby union centres
Rugby union wings